The E. H. Hobe House or Solheim (Norwegian for "Home of the Sun") was built in 1897 by Engelbrecht H. Hobe, a Norwegian immigrant, who worked for the newspaper Nordvesten, was a lumber dealer, steam-ship agent, and who became Vice-Consul, then Consul to the Norwegian-Swedish Kingdoms. The Victorian home was visited by Swedish King Gustav V and Crown Prince Olav and Princess Märtha of Norway. In 1918, Hobe purchased the Phillip J. Reilly house in St. Paul (565 Dayton Avenue), and thereafter used Solheim primarily as a summer home.  The estate on Bald Eagle Lake was designed by Minneapolis architect Carl F. Struck.

References

Houses in Ramsey County, Minnesota
Houses completed in 1897
Houses on the National Register of Historic Places in Minnesota
White Bear Lake, Minnesota
Victorian architecture in Minnesota
National Register of Historic Places in Ramsey County, Minnesota